The list of ship launches in 1800 includes a chronological list of some ships launched in 1800.


References

1800
Ship launches